Saia Makisi (born 26 November 1981) is a Tongan rugby league footballer who plays for Villegailhenc-Aragon XIII in the Elite Two Championship.

Playing career
Saia has represented Tonga in six International games between 2002 and 2006 and scored a try against Cumbria in 2006.

Saia played for the New Zealand Residents sevens Team in the World Sevens competition in Australia in 2004 and was immediately signed up by Cronulla Sharks.
He played for the Canterbury-Bankstown Bulldogs in the 2005 and 2006 NSWRL Premier League before signing for the Western Suburbs Magpies in the NSWRL Premier League and the Chester Hill Rhinos in the 2007 Jim Beam Cup.

He signed a twelve-month contract for Whitehaven for the 2008 National League One season. He left the club in September 2008, joining AS Carcassonne in France.

References

1981 births
Living people
AS Carcassonne players
Expatriate rugby league players in Australia
Expatriate rugby league players in England
Expatriate rugby league players in France
Northern Pride RLFC players
Rugby league second-rows
Rugby league centres
Rugby league players from Lower Hutt
Rugby league wingers
Tongan expatriate rugby league players
Tongan expatriate sportspeople in Australia
Tongan expatriate sportspeople in England
Tongan expatriate sportspeople in France
Tongan emigrants to New Zealand
Tongan rugby league players
Tonga national rugby league team players
Villegailhenc Aragon XIII players
Whitehaven R.L.F.C. players
Wynnum Manly Seagulls players